was a Japanese samurai of the late Edo period who was a retainer of the Matsudaira clan of Aizu. He served in the Aizu administration as a karō. He fought in the Boshin War, and led the defense of Wakamatsu against the Imperial Japanese Army, together with Tanaka Tosa. When the Aizu forces were overwhelmed, Jinbo and Tanaka retreated to a nearby residence and committed seppuku.

References
Tsunabuchi Kenjo (1984). Matsudaira Katamori no subete.
Nakamura Akihiko (2006). Byakkotai.
Hoshi Ryōichi (2005). Onnatachi no Aizusensō.

Samurai
1816 births
1868 deaths
People from Aizu
Seppuku from Meiji period to present
People of the Boshin War
Karō
Aizu-Matsudaira retainers
Suicides by sharp instrument in Japan
1860s suicides